Podeni is a commune located in Mehedinți County, Oltenia, Romania. It is composed of three villages: Gornenți, Mălărișca and Podeni.

References 

Communes in Mehedinți County
Localities in Oltenia